Enga Pattan Sothu is a 1975 Indian Tamil-language Western film produced, written, directed and photographed by M. Karnan. It was released on 24 January 1975, and emerged a commercial success.

Plot

Cast 
 Jaishankar
 Rajakokila
 Sivakumar
 Karan
 Asokan
 Raj Mallika
 Thengai Srinivasan

Production 
Enga Pattan Sothu is the fourth and final Western film directed by Karnan. Unlike the earlier three (Kalam Vellum, Ganga and Jakkamma) which were in black-and-white, it was shot in Eastman Color Negative.

Themes 
Critic Swarnavel Eswaran Pillai compared Enga Pattan Sothu to Karnan's previous Western films for the narrative being fuelled by the death of a family member of the protagonist. R. C. Jayanthan, writing for Hindu Tamil Thisai, noted the film's similarities to those made by Sergio Leone.

Soundtrack 
The soundtrack was composed by Shankar–Ganesh.

References

Bibliography

External links 
 

1970s Tamil-language films
1975 Western (genre) films
Films directed by M. Karnan
Films scored by Shankar–Ganesh
Indian Western (genre) films